Bălășești is a commune in Galați County, Western Moldavia, Romania, with a population of 2,514. It is composed of four villages: Bălășești, Ciurești, Ciureștii Noi and Pupezeni.

References

Communes in Galați County
Localities in Western Moldavia